NASA Astronaut Group 13 (the Hairballs) was a group of 23 astronauts announced by NASA on 17 January 1990. The group name came from its selection of a black cat as a mascot, to play against the traditional unlucky connotations of the number 13.

Pilots 
Kenneth Cockrell (born 1950), U.S. Navy (5 flights)

STS-56  (Science Mission; Flew as a Mission specialist)
STS-69  (2nd flight of the Wake Shield Facility)
STS-80  (3rd flight of the Wake Shield Facility)
STS-98  (ISS Assembly Mission - Launched the Destiny Laboratory Module)
STS-111  (ISS Resupply Mission; Launched Expedition 5)

Eileen Collins (born 1956), U.S. Air Force (4 flights)

STS-63  (Shuttle-Mir Mission; became the first female pilot of a U.S. Spacecraft)
STS-84  (Shuttle-Mir Mission)
STS-93  (Deployed Chandra X-Ray Observatory; became the first female commander of a U.S. Spacecraft)
STS-114  (Return to Flight)

William G. Gregory (born 1957), U.S. Air Force (1 flight)

STS-67  (2nd flight of the ASTRO telescope)

James D. Halsell (born 1956), U.S. Air Force (5 flights)

STS-65  (Science Mission)
STS-74  (Shuttle-Mir Mission)
STS-83  (Intended to be a Science Mission; Mission cut short due to fuel cell problems)
STS-94  (Science Mission using experiments intended to be conducted on STS-83)
STS-101  (ISS Supply Mission)

Charles J. Precourt (born 1955), U.S. Air Force (4 flights)

STS-55  (German Spacelab Mission)
STS-71  (Shuttle-Mir Mission)
STS-84  (Shuttle-Mir Mission)
STS-91  (Shuttle-Mir Mission)

Richard A. Searfoss (1956-2018), U.S. Air Force (3 flights)

STS-58  (Science Mission)
STS-76  (Shuttle-Mir Mission)
STS-90  (Science Mission)

Terrence W. Wilcutt (born 1949), U.S. Marine Corps (4 flights)

STS-68  (Science Mission)
STS-79  (Shuttle-Mir Mission)
STS-89  (Shuttle-Mir Mission)
STS-106  (ISS Supply Mission)
Nasa astronaut group 13

Mission specialists 

Daniel W. Bursch (born 1957), U.S. Navy (4 flights)

STS-51  (Launched the ACTS satellite)
STS-68  (Science Mission)
STS-77  (Spartan-207)
STS-108  (ISS Resupply Mission)
ISS Expedition 4  (6 month mission to the ISS)
STS-111  (The mission landed Expedition 4)

Leroy Chiao (born 1960), Engineer (4 flights)

STS-65  (Science Mission)
STS-72  (Returned Japan's Space Flyer Unit)
STS-92  (ISS Assembly Mission - Launched the Z1 Truss Segment and PMA-3)
Soyuz TMA-5 (The launch and landing vehicle of Expedition 10)
ISS Expedition 10 (6 month mission to the ISS)

Michael R. Clifford (1952-2021), U.S. Army (3 flights)

STS-53  (Classified DoD Mission)
STS-59  (Science Mission)
STS-76  (Shuttle-Mir Mission)

Nancy J. Currie (born 1958), U.S. Army (4 flights)

STS-57  (Science Mission)
STS-70  (Launched TDRS 7)
STS-88  (ISS Assembly Mission - Launched Unity (Node 1), PMA-1, and PMA-2)
STS-109  (Hubble Space Telescope Servicing Mission; Columbia's last successful flight)

Bernard A. Harris, Jr. (born 1956), Physician (2 flights)

STS-55  (German Spacelab Mission)
STS-63  (Shuttle-Mir Mission)

Susan J. Helms (born 1958), U.S. Air Force (5 flights)

STS-54  (Launched TDRS 6)
STS-64  (Science Mission)
STS-78  (Science Mission)
STS-101  (ISS Supply Mission)
STS-102  (The mission launched Expedition 2)
ISS Expedition 2 (6 month mission to the ISS)
STS-105  (The mission landed Expedition 2)

Thomas D. Jones (born 1955), U.S. Air Force (4 flights)

STS-59  (Science Mission)
STS-68  (Science Mission)
STS-80  (3rd flight of the Wake Shield Facility)
STS-98  (ISS Assembly Mission - Launched the Destiny Laboratory Module)

William S. McArthur (born 1951), U.S. Army (4 flights)

STS-58  (Science Mission)
STS-74  (Shuttle-Mir Mission)
STS-92  (ISS Assembly Mission - Launched the Z1 Truss Segment and PMA-3)
Soyuz TMA-7 (The launch and landing vehicle of Expedition 12)
ISS Expedition 12  (6 month mission to the ISS; was the Expedition 12 CDR)

James H. Newman (born 1956), Physicist (4 flights)

STS-51  (Launched the ACTS satellite)
STS-69  (2nd flight of the Wake Shield Facility)
STS-88  (ISS Assembly Mission - Launched Unity (Node 1), PMA-1, and PMA-2)
STS-109  (Hubble Space Telescope Servicing Mission; Columbia's last successful flight)

Ellen Ochoa (born 1958), Engineer (4 flights)

STS-56  (Science Mission)
STS-66  (Science Mission - ATLAS-03)
STS-96  (ISS Supply Mission)
STS-110  (Launched the S0 Truss Segment)

Ronald M. Sega (born 1952), U.S. Air Force (2 flights)

STS-60  (Shuttle-Mir Mission)
STS-76  (Shuttle-Mir Mission)

Donald A. Thomas (born 1955), Engineer (4 flights)

STS-65  (Science Mission)
STS-70  (Launched TDRS 7)
STS-83  (Intended to be a Science Mission; Mission cut short due to fuel cell problems)
STS-94  (Science Mission using experiments intended to be conducted on STS-83)

Janice E. Voss (1956-2012), Engineer (5 flights)

STS-57  (Science Mission)
STS-63  (Shuttle-Mir Mission)
STS-83  (Intended to be a Science Mission; Mission cut short due to fuel cell problems)
STS-94  (Science Mission using experiments intended to be conducted on STS-83)
STS-99  (Shuttle Radar Topography Mission)

Carl Walz (1955), Physicist (5 flights)

STS-51  (Satellite deployment Astronomy)
STS-65  (Micro-gravity research)
STS-79  (Shuttle-Mir Mission)
STS-108  (Crew rotation to the International Space Station ISS)
ISS Expedition 4 (6 month mission to the ISS)
STS-111  (Crew rotation to the International Space Station ISS)

Peter Wisoff (1958), Physicist (4 flights)

STS-57  (1st flight of Spacehab - Satellite retrieval)
STS-68  (Space Radar Lab-2 (SRL-2) )
STS-81  (Shuttle-Mir Mission)
STS-92  (delivered the Z1 truss and Pressurized Mating Adapter 3 to the International Space Station ISS)

David Wolf (1956), Medical Doctor, Engineer, Inventor (5 flights)

STS-58  (Spacelab Life Sciences 2)
STS-86  (Shuttle-Mir Mission)
STS-89  (Shuttle-Mir Mission)
STS-112  (delivered the S1 truss segment to the International Space Station ISS)
STS-127  (install the final two components of the Japanese Experiment Module)

References

External links

NASA Astronaut Corps
Lists of astronauts